Montmeneu or Punta de Montmaneu is a mountain in Catalonia, Spain. It is located within the La Granja d'Escarp and Seròs municipal limits, Segrià.

Geography
Montmeneu is an isolated hill of the Catalan Central Depression. Since it is surrounded by flat landscape the mountain is visible over long distances. 

There is a triangulation station at the top marked "247126001". Although it is not the highest hill in the region —the Puntal dels Escambrons is 5 m higher— the top offers extensive views of the surrounding landscape.

This mountain is one of the Emblematic summits of Catalonia.

See also
Mountains of Catalonia

References

External links
 Map Segrià, ICC 1:50.000
Wikiloc - Montmeneu hiking route

Mountains of Catalonia
Segrià
Emblematic summits of Catalonia